Haruka is a genus of nematoceran flies in the family Pachyneuridae. There is at least one described species in Haruka, H. elegans.

References

Further reading

External links

 

Bibionomorpha genera